Athanasios "Thanasis" Skourtopoulos (alternate spelling: Thanassis) (Greek: Αθανάσιος "Θανάσης" Σκουρτόπουλος; born May 23, 1965) is a Greek professional basketball coach and a former professional basketball player. He is the current head coach for Astoria Bydgoszcz of the Polish Basketball League (PLK).

Club playing career
Skourtopoulos played professional basketball with the Greek clubs Dafni Dafniou, Pagrati, and AEK Athens. He was a member of the AEK Athens team that made it to the Greek Cup Finals, in 1988.

Club coaching career
Some of the clubs Skourtopoulos has been the head coach of include: Aigaleo, Peristeri, Panellinios, Ikaros Kallitheas, Panionios, and Keravnos. In 2014, he became the head coach of Rethymno. In 2016, he became the head coach of Apollon Patras. In 2017, he became the head coach of GSL Faros.

On July 1, 2018, Skourtopoulits returned to Panionios. However, he later quit without coaching the team in any games.

On February 4, 2023, he signed with Astoria Bydgoszcz of the Polish Basketball League (PLK).

National team coaching career
Skourtopoulos worked as an assistant coach of the senior men's Greek national basketball team at the following tournaments: the 2014 FIBA World Cup, the EuroBasket 2015, the 2016 Turin FIBA World Olympic Qualifying Tournament, and the EuroBasket 2017.

He became the head coach of Greece's senior men's national team in October 2017. He first coached Greece at the 2019 FIBA World Cup qualifiers. He also coached Greece at the actual 2019 FIBA World Cup. After the 2019 FIBA World Cup, the Hellenic Basketball Federation announced that Rick Pitino would be Greece's head coach at the 2020 FIBA Victoria Olympic Qualifying Tournament and the 2020 Summer Olympics, should Greece qualify, while Skourtopoulos would remain as Greece's head coach for the 2021 EuroBasket qualification tournament.

Personal life
Skourtopoulos failed to lead the senior Greek national basketball team to the results at the 2019 FIBA World Cup, in China, that many analysts, and sports media had predicted. Some major US sports media criticized his use of the MVP of the 2018–19 NBA season, Giannis Antetokounmpo at the tournament.

Awards and accomplishments

Assistant coach
Greek Cup Winner: (2001)
Greek League Champion: (2002)

References

External links
EuroCup Coaching Profile
FIBA Coaching Profile
All4Basketball.com Profile
FIBA Player Profile
Hellenic Federation Profile 

1965 births
Living people
AEK B.C. players
Aigaleo B.C. coaches
Apollon Patras B.C. coaches
Basketball players from Athens
Greek basketball coaches
Greek men's basketball players
Greece national basketball team coaches
Gymnastikos S. Larissas B.C. coaches
Ikaros B.C. coaches
Iraklis Thessaloniki B.C. coaches
Keravnos B.C. coaches
Pagrati B.C. players
Panellinios B.C. coaches
Panionios B.C. coaches
Peristeri B.C. coaches
Rethymno B.C. coaches